Nirahua Hindustani 3 is a 2018 Indian Bhojpuri-language action romance comedy film directed by Manjul Thakur and produced by Pravesh Lal Yadav under banner of "Nirahua Entertainment Pvt Ltd". Dinesh Lal Yadav in leading role along with Amrapali Dubey and Shubhi Sharma. Sanjay Pandey, Kiran Yadav, Samarth Chaturvedi, Ashish Shendre, Pallavi Koli, Oshin Kamboj, Samarth Chaturvedi, Ritu Pandey, Shweta Verma and Sanjay Mahanand feature in supporting roles.

This is the third film of the "Nirahua Hindustani" series, along with "Nirahua Hindustani" and "Nirahua Hindustani 2". This is the first franchise in the history of Bhojpuri cinema to have a third installment. The film's music was composed by Rajnish Mishra with lyrics by Pyare Lal, Shyam Dehati and Azad Singh.

Plot
The story begins from Mumbai where Nirahua comes in search of her dream queen. Where he meets a struggling actress Sona, who sees Sona as her dream queen. But Sona does not like Nirahua, she has a dream to become a big actress. That is why he quarrels with his mother and father and his parents stop sending him the expenses. So she goes an office for job but only married people are given jobs there, for which Sona gets a fake wedding card printed from a studio and the photographer accidentally prints Nirahua's photo on the card. Sona starts the job by showing that card in her office. One day Sona's friend Tanu sells some remaining cards with useless newspapers. After seeing the card Nirahua reaches his office to meet Sona. But one day the owner of the company learns of Sona's forgery and he removes Sona from the job. Sona does not even have the money to pay rent the house, due to which the landlord vacates the house. In this difficult time, Nirahua supports Sona, Sona also starts living in relationship with Nirahua. But one day Nirahua's father discovers this and goes to Mumbai to meet Nirahua. Nirahua requests Sona to be a cultured daughter-in-law in front of her father but Sona refuses this. then Nirahua hire a wife on rent his  named Champa.

Nirahua's father likes Champa very much and goes to her village with Nirahua and Champa, where he arranged Nirahua and Champa married again. Champa takes money from Nirahua for all these tasks, but Champa gradually falls in love with Nirahua for her goodness. At the same time, in Mumbai Sona also gets a film and goes to meet the producer with the director, where the producer asks Sona to do the sacrifice instead of giving the role, which she refuses this. And she realizes her mistake and she goes to Nirahua's village to marry him. Nirahua is happy to see Sona and tells Champa to go back to Mumbai. Which Champa refuses and says that I accept it was all a drama but the marriage between her and Nirahua is not a drama. But Nirahua refused to accept Champa as his wife. Then Champa says that she was married in the presence of all the villagers, and just saying no does not break it. Her divorce should also be done with all the customs, then the divorce of Nirahua and Champa is organized in front of all the villagers. Where Pandit frees Nirahua from all the seventh truths and says that the biggest adornment of Suhagan woman is Mangalasutra of her neck and there is vermilion in the hair. And Nirhua takes Mangalasutra from Champa's throat. When Pandit asks to Nirahua for wash the vermilion of Champa's hair, his hands tremble and he says that I can break all the seventh truths but cannot wash a suhagan's hair's vermilion. Finally Nirahua accepts Champa as his wife instead of Sona.

Cast
 Dinesh Lal Yadav as Nirahua Yadav
 Amrapali Dubey as Champa
 Shubhi Sharma as Sona Chaudhary
 Sanjay Pandey as Jharkhandey Yadav
 Kiran Yadav as Nirahua's mother
 Ashish Shendre as Nirahua's father
 Samarth Chaturvedi as Nirahua's elder brother
 Ritu Pandey as Jharkhandey's wife
 Shweta Verma as Nirahua's sister-in-law
 Pallavi Koli as Tanu (Sona's friend)
 Oshin Kamboj as Sona's friend
 Sanjay Mahanand as Kanta Jha (photographer)
 Manjul Thakur as A Customer, who bought Closeup

Production

Filming
The film was shot in beautiful locations of Chhattisgarh like Koliyari village, Highway Hotel, Mittal Hotel and Fit Life Gym in Dhamtari district, Bunglow Raipur and Raipur city in Raipur district with some scenes shot in Akashwadi Jhopadpatti and Adventure Park Beach in Mumbai.

Post-production
The script of 'Nirahua Hindustani 3' has been written by Arbind Tiwari while music has been composed by Rajnish Mishra. The cinematography is by Siddharth Singh. Kanu Mukharjee and Nishant Upadhyay have choreographed the dance numbers. Andalib Pathan has directed the action and stunts in the film. Dress designed by Kavita Sunita Creation while publicity designed by Narsu Bahera (Shakti Arts). Art direction done by Nazir Sheikh while background music scored by Aslam Surty. Post-production done in "Audio Lab" while editing done by "Nirahua Entertainment". VFX done by "Humming Bird VFX Studio".

Release
The film was released on 14 November 2018 on occasion of Chhath in the all theatres of Bihar and this film has got the biggest opening of the year 2018 in Bhojpuri Cinema. On 21 December 2018, it also released in all theatres of Mumbai and Gujarat and emerged as one of the biggest Bhojpuri blockbusters of the year.

Soundtrack

The soundtrack for "Nirahua Hindustani 3" was composed by Rajnish Mishra with lyrics written by Pyare Lal Yadav, Shyam Dehati and Azad Singh. The soundtrack included an unusually large number of songs at 10. It was produced under Nirahua's own company, the "Nirahua Music World" label.

The song "Chicken Biryani Champa Ki Jawani" was successful on YouTube. It was released on 20 October 2018 at YouTube. Within the first week, it had collected 1.5 million views.

Marketing
The first-look poster was released on producer Pravesh Lal Yadav's official Instagram account on 28 August 2018. He says film release in this Chhath Pooja on all theatres. A teaser was released on 22 September 2018 on the official YouTube channel of "SRK Music", which also bought the satellite rights.

The trailer of this film was released on 12 October 2018 at YouTube official Channel of "SRK Music".
 
The film also stream at Online video platform site YouTube on 27 March 2019 at official handle of "SRK Music" and create a records with 10 million views in just 2 day. He made another record first film in Bhojpuri Cinema to get 50 million views in just two months. Ecstatic over the good news, the lead stars of the film Aamrapali and Nirahua share a poster of the film on their respective social media handles his film crossed over 100 millions views in just one year.

Award and nominations

References

2018 films
Indian action comedy films
2010s Bhojpuri-language films
Films released on YouTube
2018 action comedy films